The Vulture sand eel (Ichthyapus vulturis, also known as the Vulture eel) is an eel in the family Ophichthidae (worm/snake eels). It was described by Max Carl Wilhelm Weber and Lieven Ferdinand de Beaufort in 1916, originally under the genus Sphagebranchus. It is a marine, tropical eel which is known from the Indo-Pacific, including Mascarenes, Pitcairn, Japan, Australia, Micronesia, and Easter Island.

The Vulture sand eel's diet consists of bony fish.

References

Ophichthidae
Fish described in 1916